SCH is the first official album by SCH. The album was released following the band's successful appearance at the 1987 Novi Rock festival in Ljubljana. The recording line-up was Teno (vocals/guitar/bass/synth/noises), Samir Bjelanović (drums), and Petar Erak (bass). 
 
The album is characterized by powerful expression, a mixture of refined noise, industrial sounds and totally ruptured tones full of breaks and twists, interfused with short melodic phrases and pieces. The band's political engagement is already in evidence - as the Slovenian independent journalist and rock critic Marjan Ogrinc remarked: "The sonic effects of this music utterly embody the question of power, authority, the personal introversion of social exteriors, domination and submission, freedom."

Track listing
 "We Are A Fault"
 "Happy Family"
 "Majna"
 "Smjena"
 "Falše"
 "Zavoj"
 "St. materijal"
 "F.LJ.P. 3"
 "Kad se svrši sve"

References

External links
 SCH Official Discography

SCH (band) albums
1987 debut albums